Guillermo Rosal (born 23 March 1945) is a Spanish bobsledder. He competed in the four-man event at the 1968 Winter Olympics.

References

1945 births
Living people
Spanish male bobsledders
Olympic bobsledders of Spain
Bobsledders at the 1968 Winter Olympics
Sportspeople from Barcelona